The Potou–Tano or Potou–Akanic languages are the only large, well-established branch of the Kwa family. They have been partially reconstructed historically by Stewart in 1989 and 2002.

Languages
The Potou branch consists of two minor languages of Ivory Coast, Ebrié and Mbato. The Tano branch includes the major languages of SE Ivory Coast and southern Ghana, Baoulé and Akan.

Potou (Potu)
Ebrié
Mbato
Tano (Akanic)
Krobu
West Tano: Abure, Eotile
Central Tano (Bia and the Akan language,  the Akan languages)
Guang

See also
Proto-Potou-Akanic reconstructions (Wiktionary)

References

External links
Proto-Potou-Akanic-Bantu reconstructions (Stewart)

 
Kwa languages